"The Poet" is an essay by U.S. writer Ralph Waldo Emerson, written between 1841 and 1843 and published in his Essays: Second Series in 1844. It is not about "men of poetical talents, or of industry and skill in meter, but of the true poet." Emerson begins the essay with the premise that man is naturally incomplete, since he "is only half himself, the other half is his expression."
Emerson says that a poet represents humanity, as one that acknowledges interdependence between the material and spiritual world:

Overview
In the essay, Emerson expresses the need for the United States to have its own new and unique poet to write about the new country's virtues and vices:

The final lines in the essay read as follows:

Insights
The essay offers a profound look at the poem and its role in society. In a paragraph mid-essay, Emerson observes:

Influence
The  essay played an instrumental role in the 1855 appearance of the first edition of  Walt Whitman's collection of poems, Leaves of Grass. After reading the essay, Whitman consciously set out to answer Emerson's call. When the book was first published, Whitman sent a copy to Emerson, whose letter in response helped launch the book to success. In that letter Emerson called the collection "the most extraordinary piece of wit and wisdom America has yet contributed".

References

Essays by Ralph Waldo Emerson
1844 essays